Patrick Bruders is an American musician who is the current bassist for heavy metal supergroup Down, former bassist of extreme metal band Goatwhore from 1997 to 2004, and former bassist for sludge metal band Crowbar from 2005 until 2013.

In 2008, Bruders joined Eyehategod's side project Outlaw Order and began live bass duties for the band, but has since parted ways with the group. He began touring as live bassist with Down in early 2011, replacing former bassist Rex Brown, before being added as a permanent member, performing live and in studio. Bruders is also a member of the New Orleans-based crust punk band Gasmiasma, Austin-based country band Pure Luck, and joined the doom metal band Saint Vitus in 2016.

Discography

Goatwhore

Crowbar

Down

Gasmiasma

Personal life 
Bruders is married to Stephanie Bruders (née Lecompte).

References 

Year of birth missing (living people)
Living people
Black metal musicians
American heavy metal bass guitarists
American male bass guitarists
Down (band)
Down (band) members
Crowbar (American band) members
Musicians from New Orleans
Musicians from El Paso, Texas